Imperial Eagle can refer to:

In heraldry 
 the military standard of the Roman Empire, see Aquila (Roman)
 the Byzantine imperial eagle
 the German Reichsadler
 the French Imperial Eagle, the regimental symbol used by Napoleon Bonaparte's French armies

Species 
 Eastern imperial eagle
 Spanish imperial eagle

Other 
 a British merchant ship of the 1780s, the Imperial Eagle

See also 
 double-headed eagle

bg:Кръстат орел